H S Ranka or Hari Singh Ranka (born 3 November 1939) is an industrialist from Rajasthan state in India. He is the founder and chairman of Modern Group. He hails from Bhilwara town in Rajasthan. Ranka established Modern Woollens in 1973. Modern Group includes the companies Modern Threads, Modern Insulators, Modern Syntex, Modern Suitings, Modern Petrofill, Modern Petrochemicals and Modern Denim.

Ranka graduated from Rajasthan University in 1959.
 
Ranka received the Indian government's 'Udyog Patra' award in 1978 and the Silver Shield of the Rajasthan Financial Corporation (RFC) in 1980 for his contribution towards the industrialisation of Rajasthan.

References

Businesspeople from Rajasthan
Living people
Rajasthani people
People from Bhilwara district
1939 births